Tyresö FF is a Swedish men's association football team in Tyresö, a municipality in Stockholm County. They are associated with the Tyresö FF women's team, which plays in the top tier of the Damallsvenskan. The men's team currently play in the Swedish Division 3.

Background
Tyresö Fotbollsförening was founded in 1971. Since their foundation Tyresö FF men's team has participated mainly in the middle divisions of the Swedish football league system, their high points being second tier football in 1985 in Division 2 Norra and in 1990 in Division 1 Norra.  On each occasion their stay in the second tier was short-lived and they were relegated at the end of the season.   The club currently plays in Division 3 Östra Svealand which is the fifth tier of Swedish football. They play their home matches at the Tyresövallen in Tyresö.

Tyresö FF are affiliated to the Stockholms Fotbollförbund.

Futsal
A great achievement for Tyresö FF was winning the 2003/2004 Swedish Futsal Championship.

Current squad

Season to season

Attendances
In recent seasons Tyresö FF have had the following average attendances:

Footnotes

External links

 Tyresö FF – Official website

Football clubs in Stockholm
Association football clubs established in 1971
1971 establishments in Sweden
Tyresö FF